Ulmus 'Plinio' is a hybrid elm cultivar derived from a crossing of the Dutch cultivar 'Plantyn' (female parent) with the Siberian Elm Ulmus pumila clone 'S.2'. 'Plinio' was raised by the Istituto per la Protezione delle Piante (IPP), in Florence and released for sale in 2003. 'Plinio' was introduced to the UK in 2004 by Hampshire & Isle of Wight Branch, Butterfly Conservation, as part of its assessment of DED-resistant cultivars as potential hosts of the endangered White-letter Hairstreak.

Description
In Italy, 'Plinio' is a rounded tree with a broad crown, the width typically equalling 70% of height, and a short, often bent, trunk. The dark-green leaves are < 6.5 cm long by 3 cm broad and glabrous on both sides, on < 6 mm petioles.  Like its compatriot 'San Zanobi', the tree is not possessed of striking autumn colours, the leaves remaining green almost until they fall in late November. The perfect, apetalous wind-pollinated flowers appear in mid March in the UK. The sessile samarae are round, 17–22 mm in diameter. Seed has exhibited a modest viability of between 10% and 20%.

Pests and diseases
'Plinio' has a very high resistance to Dutch Elm Disease. In trials conducted by the Istituto per la Protezione delle Piante, Florence, 'Plinio' sustained 7.8% defoliation and 3.9% dieback when inoculated with unnaturally high concentrations of the fungal pathogen, compared with 50% / 35.5% resp. for 'Lobel', and 95% / 100% for 'CNR118', a Field Elm (Ulmus minor) native to  Italy.

Cultivation
Fast growing (though slower than its stablemate 'San Zanobi') in Italy, where it commences flowering in its third year. The tree was introduced to the UK by Butterfly Conservation in 2004 and is being evaluated at several sites in Hampshire, where it has been found to be particularly successful on thin dry rendzinas. However, on more fertile soils, the relatively sparse and splaying top growth often exceeds stem and root development.

As of 1 January 2018, the importation of 'Plinio' into the UK from Italy is prohibited, the plant unable to qualify for a phytopassport owing to the prevalence of Elm Yellows in the region of cultivation. 

'Plinio' is not known (2016) to have been introduced to North America or Australasia.

Etymology
'Plinio' is named for the early Roman scientist Pliny the Elder (Plinio in Italian).

Accessions

Europe
Grange Farm Arboretum, Lincolnshire, UK. Acc. no. 694.
Great Fontley Farm, Fareham, UK. Butterfly Conservation Elm Trials plantation, Home Field (planted 2004).
Royal Botanic Garden Edinburgh, UK. Acc. no. 20042083
Sir Harold Hillier Gardens, Romsey, UK. Acc. no. 2004.0936
Wijdemeren City Council, Netherlands. Elm collection, elm lane 's-Gravelandsevaartweg, Loosdrecht, ten trees planted 2014

Nurseries

Europe
UmbraFlor , Spello, Italy.

References

Hybrid elm cultivar
Ulmus articles with images
Ulmus